Rajesh Kumar Grover is an Indian oncologist and former director and chief executive officer of Delhi State Cancer Institute, New Delhi. The Government of India honoured him, in 2014, with the award of Padma Shri, the fourth highest civilian award, for his contributions to the field of medicine.

Dr Grover has over 50 scientific papers to his credit and has attended over 100 conferences and workshops in India and abroad. [1][2][3][4] Research Gate has published ten of his articles in their online repository.[5]

References

Further reading

External links

 

Living people
Recipients of the Padma Shri in medicine
Indian oncologists
Indian medical writers
Indian medical researchers
20th-century Indian medical doctors
Year of birth missing (living people)